Johann Büsen (born 1984 in Paderborn) is a German visual artist.

Life 

Johann Büsen studied from 2005 to 2010 at the Bremen University of the Arts and got his diploma with Peter Bialobrzeski. Since 2003 he has participated in various group and solo exhibitions. He lives and works in Bremen.

Work 

Johann Büsen draws, photographs and takes motifs from various media - from conventional printed matter to images from the Internet. The edited elements are condensed into new, surreal stories. Digital painting is created on the computer using a graphics tablet and various programs.

In 2016 he won an invitation to tender from the Bremen Senator for Culture to redesign the Bremen Art Tunnel, a bicycle and pedestrian tunnel between Osterdeich and Wallanlagen (Bremen). He designed around 500 square meters here in public space from 200 sheets of paper sealed with clear lacquer. He created Bremen's longest work of art.

Exhibitions (selection) 

Solo exhibitions
 2008: Interrupt, Galerie Des Westens, Bremen
 2009: Pop-Up, Städtische Galerie im Königin-Christinen-Haus, Zeven
 2011: Kurzurlaub, Galerie Mitte, Bremen
 2012: Excursion, Galerie G.A.S.-Station, Berlin
 2013: Coexistence, Evelyn Drewes Galerie, Hamburg
 2013: Hide + Seek, NWWK Neuer Worpsweder Kunstverein, Worpswede
 2014: In Between, Galerie Brennecke, Berlin
 2014: Twisted Signs, Kunstförderverein, Weinheim
 2016: Elsewhere, Kunstverein, Wedemark
 2018: Secrets, Venet-Haus Galerie, Neu-Ulm
 2019: Digitale Malerei, Lippische Gesellschaft für Kunst, Detmold

Group exhibitions
 2005: Wer Visionen hat soll zum Arzt gehen, Gesellschaft für Aktuelle Kunst, Bremen
 2006: 83. Herbstausstellung, Städtische Galerie KUBUS, Hannover
 2009: 15 Positionen zeitgenössischer Kunst, Vorwerk – Zentrum für zeitgenössische Kunst, Syke
 2011: 7. Kunstfrühling, Güterbahnhof, Bremen
 2011: Krieg im Frieden, Kunstpavillon München
 2012: Mediated Visions, Galerie Wedding, Berlin
 2012: Salon Schwarzenberg, Galerie Neurotitan, Berlin
 2013: Discover Me, Ostfriesisches Landesmuseum Emden
 2014: 37. Bremer Förderpreis für Bildende Kunst, Städtische Galerie Bremen
 2014: Videodox, Galerie der Künstler, München
 2014: Urban Art - Wie die Street Art ins Museum kam, Schloss Agathenburg
 2015: Weltraum, Rathausgalerie Kunsthalle, München
 2015: Knotenpunkt, Affenfaust Galerie, Hamburg
 2015: Salon Salder, Städtische Kunstsammlungen, Salzgitter
 2016: Zwei Meter unter Null, Kunsthalle Wilhelmshaven
 2018: Summer Breeze, 30works Galerie, Köln

Awards 
 2007: 29. Internationaler Kunstpreis, Schloss Freienfels, Hollfeld
 2010: Paula Modersohn-Becker Nachwuchs-Kunstpreis, Kunsthalle, Worpswede
 2018: 10-monatiges Arbeitsstipendium, St. Stephani (Bremen)

Weblinks 

 Website von Johann Büsen
 
 Johann Büsen, Artfacts

References 

Modern artists
German male painters
German contemporary artists
Artists from North Rhine-Westphalia
People from Paderborn
1984 births
Living people